Black Rat is a restaurant located in Winchester, Hampshire, England. , the restaurant lost its one star in the Michelin Guide that had been held since 2011.
The restaurant closed in 2022.

See also
 List of Michelin starred restaurants

External links
 Official site

References

Restaurants in Hampshire
Michelin Guide starred restaurants in the United Kingdom
Winchester